Nga Ying Chau, or Cap Island, was an island off the northeast shore of Tsing Yi Island of Hong Kong, separated by a small harbour, Mun Tsai Tong, with Tsuen Wan at its northeast, just across the Rambler Channel. When the small harbour was reclaimed for the development of a new town, the island became part of Tsing Yi Island. The island was once home to the CRC Oil Storage Depot, which later relocated to the other side of Tsing Yi Island owing to its proximity to the residential area. The former island is now a small hill on the northeast point of Tsing Yi Island, and Villa Esplanada, a private housing estate, stands on the hills.

There is also a park called Nga Ying Chau Garden in the vicinity of the former island.

See also
 List of islands and peninsulas of Hong Kong
 List of places in Hong Kong

References

Tsing Yi
Former islands of Hong Kong